Athletics competitions at the 2010 Central American Games were held at the Estadio Rommel Fernández in Ciudad de Panamá, Panamá, between April 16–19, 2010.

A total of 39 events were contested, 20 by men and 19 by women. Although initially scheduled, 8 events were finally cancelled: 35 km Walk, Hammer Throw, Pole Vault, and Marathon for men, and 
10 km Walk, Triple Jump, Pole Vault, and Marathon for women.

Records

13 new games records were set.

Key

Medal summary

The official website is no longer available, but a couple of pages were archived.

Medal winners as shown below were published in various sources: On the webpage
of the Central American Isthmus Athletic Confederation (Spanish: Confederación Atlética del Istmo Centroamericano) CADICA.
Results from
the first three days were compiled from the CACAC webpage.  Medal winners were published on the webpage of the Panamanian Sports Institute (Spanish: Instituto Panameño de Deportes).

Men

Women

Medal table (unofficial)

Participation
According to an unofficial count, 114 athletes from 6 countries participated.

 (6)
 (21)
 (10)
 (13)
 (19)
 (45)

References

Athletics at the Central American Games
International athletics competitions hosted by Panama
Central American Games
2010 in Panamanian sport